Thomas Edgar Manning (2 September 1884 – 22 November 1975) was an English cricketer who played first-class cricket for Northamptonshire from 1906 to 1922, captaining the team from 1908 to 1910. 

Manning appeared in 53 first-class matches as right-handed batsman and occasional wicketkeeper. He scored 1,026 runs with a highest score of 57 and claimed 32 victims including three stumpings.

He was president of the county club from 1948 to 1955.

References

External links
 
 

1884 births
1975 deaths
People educated at Wellingborough School
Alumni of Jesus College, Cambridge
English cricketers
Northamptonshire cricketers
Northamptonshire cricket captains
Cricketers from Northampton